Poreber is a dispersed settlement in the Municipality of Kamnik in the Upper Carniola region of Slovenia.

Geography
Poreber is a village composed of scattered farms between the Gozd Plateau and Soteska in the Tuhinj Valley. Three of the farms belong to the hamlet of Kavran along the road into the Tuhinj Valley. Several smaller creeks join near the village to form Porebrščica Creek. There are meadows and high-quality fields on the steep sunny slopes in the village.

History
Poreber was mentioned in written sources in 1209. According to the land registry for the domain of Gornji Grad in 1426, the village was an administrative seat for 15 surrounding villages. A water main was installed in the village in 1902, leading from a catchwater below Vovar Hill to the northwest.

References

External links
Poreber on Geopedia

Populated places in the Municipality of Kamnik